Ferdinando "Nando" Minoia (2 June 1884 – 28 June 1940) was an Italian racing driver with an exceptionally long, distinguished and varied career.  In 1907, he won the Coppa Florio driving an Isotta Fraschini. In 1923, he drove the world’s first mid-engine Grand Prix car, the Benz Tropfenwagen. In 1927, he won the inaugural Mille Miglia driving an OM. Finally, in 1931 he became the first European Champion, driving for Alfa Romeo, but without winning a single event.

Career notes and milestones 

At the 1923 Italian Grand Prix at Monza he finished fourth in the world’s first mid-engine Grand Prix car, the Benz Tropfenwagen, trailing behind the superior supercharged Fiats.  Edmund Rumpler’s ground breaking design used a normally aspirated, 1991 cc, 6 cylinder, twin cam Benz engine delivering only  which was mounted behind the driver in the ‘tear drop’ design. The car also featured swing axle independent rear suspension and inboard brakes.

In 1924, at the Targa Florio he drove 4.9-litre Steyr VI Kausen, but retired after 3 laps because the mechanic was exhausted.  He also finished 4th in the Italian Grand Prix in the Alfa Romeo P2.

In the 1925 24 Hours of Le Mans, he finished 25th, driving a 2-litre Officine Meccaniche (O.M.) Tipo 665 Superba with Vincenzo Coffani.

In the 1926 24 Hours of Le Mans, he finished 4th, driving a 2-litre O.M. Tipo 665 Superba with Giulio Foresti.

The same year, he finished 5th in a Bugatti 39A at the Grand Prix of Europe at Circuito Lasarte.

In 1927, Minoia lead an O.M. 123 at the inaugural Mille Miglia with Giuseppe Morandi, averaging   for 21 hours 4 minutes 48 seconds. That year, he finished 4th at the Italian Grand Prix in an O.M. 865 and raced a Bugatti 35C at the Targa Florio.

In 1931, the A.I.A.C.R. introduced a European Championship for drivers, that was nominally contested over the three 10-hour Grands Prix, the Italian Grand Prix, French Grand Prix, and Belgian Grand Prix.  He accrued sufficient points to become champion without winning a race, narrowly beating his Alfa Romeo teammate Giuseppe Campari, who had jointly won the Italian Grand Prix with Tazio Nuvolari driving the Alfa Romeo Monza.  Minoia shared second place in the Italian Grand Prix and shared 6th place in the French Grand Prix driving an Alfa Romeo 8C-2300.  He then finished joint 3rd in the Belgian Grand Prix having changed to the Alfa Romeo 6C-1750.

With Carlo Canavesi, he drove a 2.3-litre supercharged Alfa Romeo 8C 2300 in the 1932 24 Hours of Le Mans but failed to finish.

Racing record

24 Hours of Le Mans results

Complete European Championship results
(key) (Races in bold indicate pole position) (Races in italics indicate fastest lap)

References

External links

Grand Prix History 
Atlas F1 – Nostalgia forum
Results Records - Quintin Cloud

1884 births
1940 deaths
Italian racing drivers
Grand Prix drivers
24 Hours of Le Mans drivers
European Championship drivers